Ronald Zehrfeld (born 15 January 1977) is a German actor. His movie roles include Barbara (2012), Inbetween Worlds (2014), and Phoenix (2014).

Career 

Zehrfeld made his film debut in 2005 with a lead role in Dominik Graf's The Red Cockatoo. He starred in the comedic pirate movie 12 Paces Without a Head directed by Sven Taddicken where he played the role of the pirate Klaus Störtebeker.

In 2010, he played a major role as an idealistic Berlin police detective in Dominik Graf's elaborate and critically acclaimed television ten-part series Im Angesicht des Verbrechens. In 2011 he works with Graf again in the crime drama "Cassandra's Warning" (2011) from the series Polizeiruf 110, this time in an unfamiliar role as a murderous villain, and in the TV crime drama The Invisible Girl. He also takes supporting role in Matthias Glasner's TV mystery thriller The Hour of the Wolf (2011).

In 2012 he starred in Christian Petzold's Barbara, which won Silver Bear for Best Director at the 62nd Berlin International Film Festival. The film was selected as the German entry for the Best Foreign Language Oscar at the 85th Academy Awards, but it did not make the final shortlist.

In 2014 Zehrfeld appeared in several movies. In Dominik Graf's historical film Beloved Sisters he played Wilhelm von Wolzogen, a college friend of the main character Friedrich Schiller, it was selected as the German entry for the Best Foreign Language Film at the 87th Academy Awards, but was not nominated. In the war drama Inbetween Worlds he appears as a German soldier in Afghanistan, who falls into a crisis of conscience. The children's film Rico, Oskar und die Tieferschatten shows him as a new resident of an apartment building in which there are mysterious happenings. He also starred in Christian Petzold's postwar drama Phoenix alongside Nina Hoss; the movie received universal acclaim from critics.

Zehrfeld won the 2016 German Film Award in the category Best Supporting Actor for his role in Lars Kraume's history-thriller film The People vs. Fritz Bauer.

Selected filmography

Awards and nominations

References

External links

1977 births
Living people
German male film actors
German male television actors
Male actors from Berlin
20th-century German male actors
21st-century German male actors